The 1972 Boston Red Sox season was the 72nd season in the franchise's Major League Baseball history. The Red Sox finished second in the American League East with a record of 85 wins and 70 losses, one-half game behind the Detroit Tigers. Due to the cancellation of games missed during the 1972 Major League Baseball strike, Detroit played (and won) one more game than Boston, allowing them to finish with a record of 86–70, winning the division by a half-game.

Offseason 
 October 10, 1971: Jim Lonborg, Ken Brett, Billy Conigliaro, Joe Lahoud, Don Pavletich, and George Scott were traded by the Red Sox to the Milwaukee Brewers for Marty Pattin, Lew Krausse Jr., Tommy Harper, and Pat Skrable (minors).
 March 22, 1972: Sparky Lyle was traded by the Red Sox to the New York Yankees for Danny Cater and a player to be named later. The Yankees completed the deal by sending Mario Guerrero to the Red Sox on June 30.

A bad trade 
After the 1971 season, the Red Sox management decided on drastic changes. First there was a trade with the Milwaukee Brewers. George Scott, who had fallen out of favor with the Red Sox management, was packaged with Billy Conigliaro (younger brother of former Red Sox star Tony Conigliaro), outfielders Joe Lahoud and Don Pavletich, pitchers Ken Brett (George Brett's older brother) and Jim Lonborg and exchanged for pitchers Marty Pattin and Lew Krausse Jr. and outfielders Tommy Harper and Pat Skrable. It was a big deal and, as it turned out, a bad one for Boston. Lonborg won 14 games for Milwaukee in 1972, with a 2.83 ERA, and later was traded to the Philadelphia Phillies, where he won 13, 17, 18, 8 and 11 games during five seasons. Scott batted .263, .266, .306, .281 and .285 in his five seasons with the Brewers, driving in 88, 107, 82, 109, and 77 runs during those same years and clouting an average of 23 homers a season, with 36 in 1975 alone. Meanwhile, although Pattin was 17–13 for Boston in 1972 a 15–15 in 1973, he was then traded away. Harper batted .254 and .281 in his two years with the Sox before being traded. Skrable, a Triple-A player, did not play professionally after the 1971 season. He refused to report to Boston, and the Red Sox received infielder Bobby Pfeil as compensation; Pfeil finished his career with Boston's Triple-A affiliate in 1972.

Regular season 

Following the 1972 Major League Baseball strike, Commissioner of Baseball Bowie Kuhn ruled that no games cancelled due to the April strike would be made up. The Red Sox played a total of 155 games of their original 162-game schedule, and finished with a record of 85–70. Meanwhile, the Detroit Tigers played 156 games, and finished with a record of 86–70. Thus, the Tigers were winners of the AL East, by a half-game over the Red Sox.

Boston and Detroit finished their regular-season schedules with a three-game series against each other, played at Tiger Stadium in Detroit. Entering the series, Boston held a half-game lead over Detroit, but Detroit won two of the three games, and the AL East title.

The first game of the series included a notable play. In the top of the third inning, Boston trailed, 1–0, and had one out with Tommy Harper at third base and Luis Aparicio at first base. Carl Yastrzemski hit a ball that looked to be a triple; Harper scored, but Aparicio fell as he rounded third base. Aparicio got up and retreated to third, but Yastrzemski was already there, causing Yastrzemski to try to return to second, resulting in Yastrzemski being tagged out. Thus, instead of having a 2–1 lead with one out and a runner at third, Boston had only tied the game and had two outs (albeit still with a runner at third). The next batter, Reggie Smith, struck out to end the inning. Boston was unable to score again, and Detroit went on to win the game, 4–1. Aparicio falling as he rounded third base is looked back upon as a key play that could have made a difference.

Season standings

Record vs. opponents

Notable transactions 
 June 6, 1972: Don Aase was drafted by the Red Sox in the 6th round of the 1972 Major League Baseball Draft.
 August 15, 1972: Chris Coletta was traded by the Red Sox to the California Angels for Andy Kosco.

Opening Day lineup 
 
Source:

Roster

Statistical leaders 

Source:

Batting 

Source:

Pitching 

Source:

Awards and honors 
Carlton Fisk, Gold Glove Award (C)

Farm system 

Source:

References

External links 
1972 Boston Red Sox team page at Baseball Reference
1972 Boston Red Sox season at baseball-almanac.com

Boston Red Sox seasons
Boston Red Sox
Boston Red Sox
Red Sox